The Tall Grass and other Stories is a short story collection written by American author Joe R. Lansdale. It was published by Gere Donovan Press. This collection is currently only available as an Amazon Kindle e-book. According to the author, it may be available as a printed book at a later date.

References

External links
Joe R. Lansdale's Official Website
Publisher's Website

Short story collections by Joe R. Lansdale
Works by Joe R. Lansdale
Ebooks
2014 short story collections